Omacha District is one of nine districts of the province Paruro in Peru.

Geography 
Other mountains are listed below:

Political division

Localities 

 Omacha
 Antayaje
 Pichaca
 Coyani
 Perccacata

 Osccollopata
 Huasquillay
 Ccaccasiqui
 Antapata
 Sauro

 Antapallpa
 Chapina
 Tahui
 Omashuaylla
 Barrio Cotacpampa
 Barrio Rosaspata
 Antaparara
 Parcco
 Ancascocha
 Vista Alegre

 Checcapucara
 Hatuncancha
 Colchapampa
 Ticamayo

 Sahua Sahua
 kcurpa-Japucalla
 Cercopampa
 Laca Laca
 Huaytahui
 Huancarani
 Huanacopampa

 Quille
 K'urpa
 Omala
 Chiuca

 Huillcuyo
 Huillcuyo Alto
 Joloña

 Huillque

 Hacca
 Paclla

Ethnic groups 
The people in the district are mainly indigenous citizens of Quechua descent. Quechua is the language which the majority of the population (94.70%) learnt to speak in childhood, 5.13% of the residents started speaking using the Spanish language (2007 Peru Census).

References